is a women's football club playing in Japan's football league, Nadeshiko League Division 1. Its hometown is the city of Kyoto.

Squad

Current squad

Results

Transition of team name
Asahi Kokusai Bunnys: 1991–1994
Takarazuka Bunnys Ladies SC: 1995–2005
Bunnys Kyoto SC: 2006–2020
Bunnys Gunma FC White Star: 2021–present

References

External links 
 official site
 Japanese Club Teams

Women's football clubs in Japan
1976 establishments in Japan
Sports teams in Kyoto Prefecture